The Ministry of Justice and Courts Administration of Samoa has several roles and responsibilities such as the following:

 Providing sound policy advice to the government
 Gathering input from the public to develop justice-related legislation and improve the justice system 
 Improving and providing judicial support through the administration, case management, technology, human resource support, and funding for judicial training and development
 Leading the Law and Justice Sector by providing advice and overseeing the managing and budgetary processes 
 Managing and processing of cases for Lands and Titles Court and Registration of Matai titles
 Resolving and collecting court-imposed monetary penalties and infringement fines
 Support corporate functions such as human resource management, information and communications technology, and other processes.

List of ministers

See also 

 Justice ministry
 Politics of Samoa

References 

Justice ministries
Government of Samoa